Kotowiecko  (German 1939-1945 Lekow / Katen) is a village in the administrative district of Gmina Nowe Skalmierzyce, within Ostrów Wielkopolski County, Greater Poland Voivodeship, in west-central Poland.

The village has an approximate population of 700.

References

Kotowiecko